Lake Benalla, an artificial lake located in Benalla in the High Country region of Victoria, Australia, was created in the 1970s.

In 2010, more than one hundred residents surrounding the lake were evacuated from their homes at Benalla. A retaining wall built in approximately 1960 to ward off floods kept the flood water level under control.

The Benalla Botanical Gardens are located on the shore of Lake Benalla.

The lake is crossed by the Hume Freeway.

See also

 List of lakes of Australia

References 

Benalla
Benalla